The Ponce de Leon Apartment Building is a historic structure located in the North Cleveland Park neighborhood in the Northwest Quadrant of Washington, D.C.  David L. Stern designed the structure in a combination of the Mission Revival and the Spanish Revival styles.  The building was completed in 1928.  It is an example of 1920s exoticism in a prominent apartment corridor in the city.  The exterior features diapered brickwork, terra cotta tile roof, limestone portico and trim, and Moorish arch motifs.  The interior features an intact lobby with a decorative plaster ceiling and a terrazzo floor.  It was listed on the National Register of Historic Places in 1994.

References

Residential buildings completed in 1928
Apartment buildings in Washington, D.C.
Mission Revival architecture in Washington, D.C.
Spanish Revival architecture in Washington, D.C.
Residential buildings on the National Register of Historic Places in Washington, D.C.